The Maui Ocean Center is an aquarium and oceanography center located in Maalaea, Hawaii, on the island of Maui. Opened on March 13, 1998, by Coral World International, the 3 acres (1.2 ha) facility is the largest living tropical reef aquarium in the Western Hemisphere. Their exhibits include colorful displays of live coral reef habitats, diverse collections of endemic Hawaiian fish species, and up-close viewing of sea turtles, stingrays, sharks, and various sea creatures. Their Humpbacks of Hawaiʻi exhibit provides detailed information on the inspiring migration of humpback whales and their migration to Hawaiian waters and ends with a first-of-its-kind 3D immersive experience in their Sphere.

Maui Ocean Center is the only public aquarium on Maui and exclusively displays marine life found in Hawaiian waters. Their exhibits are home to the world's largest display of Pacific corals, and they have been listed among TripAdvisor's top 10 aquariums to visit. Their mission is to foster understanding, wonder, and respect for Hawaiʻi's marine life, and they strive to educate the public on conservation issues and current threats to the ocean.

Exhibits 

Maui Ocean Center has six main exhibits that focus on reef fish, deep water animals, Hawaiian culture and history, and more.

Living Reef 
The Living Reef exhibit showcases over 40 Hawaiian coral species that range from shallow to deep-reef environments. Guests can observe the changes in species and coloration of marine life as they journey from the shallow reef to mid reef, and eventually, the deep reef.

Turtle Lagoon 
This exhibit is home to the Hawaiian green sea turtle, one of Earth's most ancient animals. Featuring both a surface and underwater view of Hawaiʻi's beloved honu (turtles), this exhibit has up to six sea turtles on display at all times.

Native to Hawaiʻi, the green sea turtle is the largest hard-shelled sea turtle in the world, reaching lengths of up to four feet and weighing in at over 300 pounds in adulthood.

Kahoʻolawe: A Story of History and Healing 
Created in collaboration with the Kaho‘olawe Island Reserve Commission (KIRC), this exhibit features the commission's previously exhibited content from the Smithsonian and Bishop Museum. Kahoʻolawe: A Story of History and Healing provides insight into the island's role in navigation, the marine life that inhabits its waters, and the role of KIRC and its volunteers. Designed to show the power of change, both good and bad, the exhibit follows Kaho‘olawe's development timeline from the first settlement to current restoration projects.

The island has long been a sacred and storied place for Native Hawaiians, and this exhibit showcases the island's culture, geography, history, and restoration. Kaho‘olawe's modern history is marked by an era of intense U.S. military target practice and the Native Hawaiian movement to reclaim and restore the island. The uninhabited island was once a center for celestial navigation training, agriculture, and spiritual practice. 

Maui Ocean Center unveiled Kaho‘olawe: A Story of History and Healing to commemorate the sacred island's past, present, and future.

Hawaiians and the Sea 
This exhibit tells the stories of the kanaka maoli, Hawaiʻi's first people, and how they sailed across the Pacific in double-hulled canoes using the stars as guides. This exhibit focuses on sharing Hawaiians’ history, culture, and unique traditions and making their profound relationship with the land (mauka) and the sea (makai) known.

Open Ocean 
Maui Ocean Center's Open Ocean exhibit features the largest tank in the state at a whopping 750,000 gallons and is teeming with hundreds of fish, rays, and multiple shark species at all times. The tank is 20 feet deep at its max and features a 20 ft main window for viewing, along with a 53-foot long acrylic tunnel where guests can watch as the creatures of the deep swim gloriously around them.

Humpbacks of Hawaiʻi & Sphere 
The latest addition to the aquarium is their Humpbacks of Hawaiʻi exhibit and Sphere. Modeled after the body of a humpback whale, the Humpbacks of Hawaiʻi exhibit is loaded with information on the marine mammals who journey to Maui's waters each year. 

As the first-of-its-kind in Hawai‘i, the Sphere marked a new era in the confluence of technology and marine observation when it opened in February 2019. This project cost $3 million to build and integrates 4k imagery, 3D active glasses, and a 7.1 surround sound system. The Sphere was built in collaboration with science and technology experts to create an opportunity for people to connect with humpbacks in their deep-sea realm without stepping foot in the water. The screen is 58 feet in diameter, slightly larger than an adult humpback whale, which allows for viewers to take in a life-sized 3D humpback whale to reach out and “touch.” The 14-minute presentation showcases the vibrant life, journeys, and social bonds of these intelligent and spiritual creatures.

Living Coral Reefs 
Maui Ocean Center has successfully raised and maintained coral colonies since 1998. Their exhibits receive saltwater directly from Māʻalaea Bay, resulting in environments that allow fish, corals, and other marine invertebrates to thrive.

MOCMI 
The Maui Ocean Center Marine Institute (MOCMI) is a 501(c)(3) organization on Maui Ocean Center's property. This nonprofit was founded in April 2016 and unveiled at the IUCN World Conservation Congress in Honolulu, HI. Their mission is to inspire lifelong environmental stewardship and ensure the survival of coral reefs and sea turtles in Hawaiʻi through science-based conservation efforts, education, and outreach.

Sea Turtle Rescue 
MOC Marine Institute (MOCMI) works in partnership with NOAA Fisheries to coordinate the response to sick, injured, distressed, or expired sea turtles on the island of Maui, Hawaiʻi. All MOCMI sea turtle stranding response and rescue activities authorized under NOAA Permit: 21260. Sea turtles are rehabilitated and released back to the ocean after they have received proper care.

Coral Restoration 
MOCMI operates one of only four land-based coral nurseries in the United States and strives to protect all rare and endemic species of coral in Hawai῾i. In the case of widespread coral die-off, MOCMI's coral repository will provide a safe haven for corals of Hawaiʻi and serve as a genetic library from which to draw upon for mitigation projects.

References

Gallery

External links
 

Aquaria in Hawaii
Museums in Maui County, Hawaii
Oceanaria in the United States
1989 establishments in Hawaii
Museums established in 1989
Coral World International's Public Aquariums